The Miss Ecuador 1969 was held on June 12, 1969. There were 14 candidates for the national title. At the end of the night, three finalists received the title of Miss Ecuador to represent the country in three different competitions, Rosana Vinueza Estrada to Miss Universe 1969, Ximena Aulestia Díaz to Miss World 1969, and Alexandra Swamberg to Miss International 1969.

Results

Placements

Special awards

Contestants

External links

Miss Ecuador
1969 beauty pageants
Beauty pageants in Ecuador
1969 in Ecuador